Molophilus appendiculatus is a species of fly in the family Limoniidae. It is found in the  Palearctic .

References

External links
Images representing Molophilus at BOLD

Limoniidae
Insects described in 1840
Taxa named by Rasmus Carl Stæger
Diptera of Europe